Under One Sky may refer to:

 Under One Sky (album), a 2009 album by John McCusker
 Under One Sky (film), a 1982 Soviet drama film